Police state is a government that exercises power arbitrarily.

Police State may also refer to:
Police State (1989 film), an Australian TV film about the Fitzgerald Inquiry
Police State (2017 film), an American sci-fi and adventure film

See also
List of fictional police states
No to police state, All-Ukrainian civil campaign against police brutality
Military rule (disambiguation)